Jordan Township may refer to:

Illinois
 Jordan Township, Whiteside County, Illinois

Indiana
 Jordan Township, Jasper County, Indiana
 Jordan Township, Warren County, Indiana

Iowa
 Jordan Township, Monona County, Iowa

Michigan
 Jordan Township, Michigan

Minnesota
 Jordan Township, Fillmore County, Minnesota

Missouri
 Jordan Township, Hickory County, Missouri
 Jordan Township, Ripley County, Missouri

Pennsylvania
 Jordan Township, Clearfield County, Pennsylvania
 Jordan Township, Lycoming County, Pennsylvania
 Jordan Township, Northumberland County, Pennsylvania

South Dakota
 Jordan Township, Tripp County, South Dakota, in Tripp County, South Dakota

Township name disambiguation pages